Maciej Jerzy Stuhr (born 23 June 1975) is a Polish actor, comedian and occasional film director.

Life and career
In 1999, he majored in psychology from the Jagiellonian University before moving on to study acting at Kraków's National Academy of Theatre Arts, which he finished in 2003. He became known for his impressions of Polish actors and performers, such as Gustaw Holoubek and he established the cabaret Po Żarcie, where he wrote most of the material. In 2013, he received the Polish Film Award for Best Actor for his role in Władysław Pasikowski's drama film Aftermath.

Among others, he is known for his role of Kuba Brenner in Chłopaki nie płaczą (Boys Don't Cry) and Piotr in Krzysztof Kieślowski's Decalogue X.

In 2006, he was a co-host, alongside Sophie Marceau, of the 19th European Film Awards held in Warsaw. Since 2008, he's been a member of Nowy Teatr, led by artistic director Krzysztof Warlikowski. The same year, he was awarded the Zbigniew Cybulski Award for best young actor.

Personal life
He is the son of actor Jerzy Stuhr and violinist Barbara Kóska. He has a younger sister named Marianna (born 1982). His ancestors came to Kraków from Lower Austria in 1879. In 2015, he married Katarzyna Błażejewska.

He is also notable for his support of the LGBT community in Poland, working with Campaign Against Homophobia.

Selected filmography

References

External links
 
  Maciej Stuhr at filmpolski.pl
  Maciej Stuhr at filmweb.pl
  Maciej Stuhr at stopklatka.pl

Living people
1975 births
Male actors from Kraków
Polish male film actors
Polish people of Austrian descent
Polish male stage actors
20th-century Polish male actors
21st-century Polish male actors
Jagiellonian University alumni